Phymatodes concolor is a species of beetle in the family Cerambycidae. It was described by Linsley in 1934.

References

Phymatodes
Beetles described in 1934